Tottenham Hale is a National Rail and London Underground interchange station located in Tottenham Hale in north London, England. On the National Rail network it is on the West Anglia Main Line,  from London Liverpool Street, and is served by Greater Anglia and Stansted Express. The station is in Travelcard Zone 3.

The station was opened in 1840, with Underground services added in 1968. A new station building is under construction, and an additional platform is being added as part of a regeneration scheme.

History

19th century
Clapton is now exclusively served by trains on the  branch instead.

The Northern and Eastern Railway was leased by the Eastern Counties Railway in 1844 who took over operation of the line.

On 12 September 1858 a passenger train collided with some goods wagons that had been shunted onto the main line. Nobody was seriously injured. Eighteen months later on 20 February 1860 the station was the site of a serious railway accident when a locomotive derailed, killing the driver, fireman and seven passengers.

The Eastern Counties Railway was taken over by the Great Eastern Railway in 1862.

Until 1868 Tottenham Hale was a railhead for cattle traffic from East Anglia. Trains were unloaded there, and the cattle driven miles down what is now the A10 road towards London. In 1868 the link (since removed) to the Tottenham and Hampstead Junction Railway was opened and the cattle traffic transferred to Tufnell Park, which was closer to the site of the cattle market off Caledonian Road.

Four years later in 1872 the route via Clapton was opened, offering a slightly more direct route to Liverpool Street.

In 1875, the suffix 'Hale' was added to the station's name; this was removed in November 1938, before being restored in 1968.

In 1882 the line through Tottenham Hale became part of a major rail freight artery, with the opening of the Great Northern and Great Eastern Joint Railway. This provided a link for the Great Eastern from the coalfields in the north to London. This led to a second pair of running lines known as the Slow Lines being added in 1913. The slow lines that exist today were previously known as the fast lines.

20th century
On 29 August 1913 a northbound mail train (carrying passengers) ran into the back of a freight train just south of the station at Tottenham South Junction. The cause was a signal passed at danger in foggy conditions. Two passengers were badly injured, 16 less so.

The area was always susceptible to flooding, one of the worst instances being between 18 and 22 February 1919 when the River Lea overflowed its banks and rail traffic was suspended.

In 1919 there were, as well as the two sets of main lines, some private sidings serving local industries. Other sidings in the area were used to clean passenger rolling stock when not in service.

In 1923 operation passed to the London & North Eastern Railway, and following nationalisation in 1948 the station became part of British Railways Eastern Region.

On 12 February 1927 an express passenger train was in collision with a lorry on a level crossing. Owing to foggy conditions, the train was not travelling at high speed.

On 4 October 1929 another accident occurred at Tottenham North Junction (just south of the station) when a goods train passed a signal at danger and was hit by a passenger train. There were no fatalities.

On 21 March 1944 (during World War Two) a number of incendiary bombs fell close to the station, destroying a lineside hut.

In 1961 the link from Tottenham South Junction to the Tottenham and Hampstead Line was closed.

On 14 July 1967 planning permission was granted for the addition of the London Underground Victoria line station. The station was renamed Tottenham Hale on 1 September 1968, when it became an interchange station with London Underground on the opening of the first stage of the Victoria line.

The Lea Valley line between Copper Mill Junction and Cheshunt was electrified at 25 kV in 1969. Many of the private goods sidings were removed at this time. Prior to electrification, between 1958 and 1969 passenger services between Cheshunt and London Liverpool Street through Tottenham Hale were normally operated by Class 125 diesel multiple units (which had been purpose-built for the line).

When sectorisation was introduced in the 1980s, the station was served by Network SouthEast until the privatisation of British Railways.

In the late 1990s, at the same time as the Stansted Express service to Stansted Airport was started, the British Rail station at Tottenham Hale was totally rebuilt; the Underground station was revamped at the same time. None of the original Victorian station now exists.

With the privatisation of the UK's railways in 1994 operation of the station was initially allocated to a business unit which succeeded the old British Railways structure before being taken over by West Anglia Great Northern (WAGN) in January 1997.

21st century

Initially owned by Prism Rail, National Express took over operation in July 2000. In 1994 responsibility for the operational infrastructure passed to Railtrack.

In August 2002 signalling control was transferred to the Liverpool Street Integrated Electronic Control Centre (IECC).

The WAGN franchise was replaced in 2004 by One, this was renamed National Express East Anglia.

The following year, following financial difficulties, Railtrack was superseded by Network Rail.

From 11 December 2005, a new service to and from Stratford reintroduced a direct passenger connection between Tottenham Hale and Stratford via the mainly freight line across Walthamstow Marshes. For many years the only service on this route had been a parliamentary "ghost train" to Enfield Town via Stratford operated to save lengthy closure (to passenger) procedures.

In February 2012 operation of the station changed once again, with Greater Anglia taking over the franchise.

Tottenham Hale bus station 
Tottenham Hale bus station is located beside the railway station.

Following the 2011 England riots which began in Tottenham, a redevelopment of the tube, bus and rail stations was used to encourage investment in the area. The £110 million bus and rail interchange project for Tottenham Hale was completed in 2014. As part of the project the bus station was roofed with ETFE, which is also used in the Eden Project.

The bus station roof was a finalist for Best Urban Design in the 2018 Haringey Design Awards 2018, and in the 2015 British Constructional Steelwork Association Structural Steel Design Awards.

Buses 
The following bus routes serve the bus station London Buses route 41, 76, 123, 192, 230, W4, N41 and N73.

Services
Tottenham Hale is served by trains operated by Greater Anglia and on London Underground's Victoria line. Services at the station are:

National Rail
 8 tph to London Liverpool Street
 4 tph to 
 2 tph to 
 2 tph to 
 4 tph to 
 2 tph to 
 2 tph to

London Underground
 27 tph to Walthamstow Central
 27 tph to Brixton

Future
Transport for London has active plans for the station to be expanded.

Specifically, the proposed Tottenham Hale Station Upgrade development comprises the following
elements:

 creating a new landmark entrance to the Station;
 increasing the capacity of the Station concourse, by doubling the size of the current ticket hall;
 improving interchange by relocating the Greater Anglia and London Underground  gatelines;
 providing new access to platforms via the new Access for All (AfA) bridge being delivered  separately by Network Rail;
 removing the existing subway which links the south side of Ferry Lane with the Station;
 extending the existing bridge to form a new Station entrance from Hale Village, providing  improved access from the east to Tottenham Hale transport interchange;
 re-routing the London Underground escape route and relocating the vent shaft;
 providing a new, upgraded Station control facility; and
 retail units.

The full plans can be seen on Haringey Council's website.

Funding is being sought to increase the number of lines from Coppermill Junction (between Lea Bridge and Tottenham Hale) and Angel Road to provide a turn-up-and-go four trains per hour service for the Lea Valley.

In February 2013, the Crossrail task force of business group London First, chaired by former Secretary of State for Transport Andrew Adonis, published its recommendations on Crossrail 2, favouring a route almost identical to the regional option proposed by TfL in 2011. The report was endorsed by Network Rail.

This proposal will see four tracks restored through Tottenham Hale and direct links to South-West London.

References

External links

London Transport Museum Photographic Archive

Victoria line stations
London Underground Night Tube stations
Tube stations in the London Borough of Haringey
Railway stations in the London Borough of Haringey
Former Great Eastern Railway stations
Railway stations in Great Britain opened in 1840
Greater Anglia franchise railway stations